Langea is a genus of beetles in the family Cicindelidae, containing the following species:

 Langea euprosopoides W. Horn, 1901
 Langea fleutiauxi W. Horn, 1915
 Langea mellicollis Sumlin, 1993

References

Cicindelidae